List of presidents of the Senate of Jamaica. The president is the presiding officer of Senate of Jamaica.

Below is a list of office-holders:

Sources
 Official website of Houses of Parliament, Jamaica

Politics of Jamaica
Jamaica, Senate

Lists of Jamaican politicians